Hainan is a town under the administration of Xinghua, in central Jiangsu, China. , it has one residential community and 18 villages under its administration.

References 

Township-level divisions of Jiangsu
Xinghua, Jiangsu